is a Japanese manga series written and illustrated by Lynn Okamoto. It was serialized in Shueisha's seinen manga magazine Weekly Young Jump from January 2012 to March 2016. An anime television series adaptation by Arms aired between April and June 2014.

Plot
Ten years ago, Ryōta Murakami along with his childhood friend Kuroneko set out to search for signs of alien life. Although Ryōta is skeptical about her theory, Kuroneko insists that aliens are real. During their search, a tragic accident occurs which gravely injures Ryōta but kills Kuroneko. Due to his strong memory, Ryōta cannot forget about Kuroneko. Since then, he has been continuously staring at the night sky in order to prove that aliens exist, and also to fulfill Kuroneko's dying wish.

Presently, Ryōta is a top student at his school and the sole member of the Astronomy Club. Until he gets the shock of his life when a new transfer student named Neko Kuroha arrives in his class. She bears a striking resemblance to Ryōta's dead childhood friend, although she dismisses the fact as a bluff. Ryōta later notices something amiss about Neko. When a student almost drowned is saved by a mysterious force, Neko predicted that Ryōta will also die. After displaying superhuman strength in saving his life, it is then revealed that Neko is a witch who escaped from an alien research lab.

Ryōta becomes a part of Neko's life, learning more about her dilemma and the hidden forces that exist in the universe. As he sinks deeper and deeper into a world of magic and artificially created witches, Ryōta must use necessary means of preserving and sheltering other escaped witches and allow them to live normally, despite knowing the scientists of the lab would kill any outsiders involved.

Characters

Astronomy Club

A high school student with high intellect and photographic memory. Ryouta has his sights set on being a researcher for NASA due to a promise he made with his beloved childhood friend Kuroneko. He is president of the astronomy club and was the only remaining member before inviting Neko and the others. After meeting the magic-users, he decides to provide shelter for them at an old observatory despite knowing that their pursuers have orders to kill whoever comes in contact with them, usually coming up with plans to have their location concealed and live normally. All the while, he is constantly looking for ways to acquire more "Death Suppressants" (DR623G), drugs that are necessary to keep the magic-users alive; and prevent the Hatching process. After the Valkyria incident, Ryouta struggle in hopes for Neko to remember the times they spent together. According to Nanami, Ryouta was also a subject of Vingulf's experiments himself, and his photographic memory is linked to the 'Edda' (a global latitude organ that stores unlimited information or consciousness he and Loki are linked with) was one of its effects, but for some reason was allowed to live a normal life. However, his lifespan was greatly shortened, and will soon die. When the Vingulf staff kidnaps Ryouta, he learns the truth about his origin. With the last of his time, Loki consumes Ryouta; in the process, Ryouta overtakes his consciousness and the merging of god powers then erases his manifestation. Ryouta's bodiless soul is left roaming the Earth, then Neko joins him inside the Edda to share their affections where a young girl approaches them, who appears to be Kazumi as a child.

She has a striking resemblance to Ryouta's supposedly deceased childhood friend  and it is later proven that both are one and the same (a birthmark with the shape of three dots is on her upper left breast). Her research no. is 7620. When Neko uses her powers, part of her memories are lost; Ryouta thus refrains from having her use them as much as possible. She joins the astronomy club as its vice-president. She loves to sing but does not do it in front of others without getting flustered. She aims to find out how many constellation there are in total.
Neko is actually a prototype Valkyria. When Neko's true power is awakened, she remembers who she really is; she regains full access to her SS-rank power. Sorcerian speculates Neko could be the Brynhildr, an entity that is being sought by the institute for a yet unknown purpose. This allows her to use the same type of abilities as Mako, as well as her ultimate ability to create a micro black hole which she used to defeat Mako's anti-matter but overexerted herself at the cost of losing all her memories, including recent ones. The new Neko is rather cold to Ryouta, due to her cluelessness. Following several adventures, Neko rediscovers her feelings when reading her former self's notebook. After Makina dragged her back to Vingulf, she was set to be offered to Loki until Ryouta re-pressed her top button harness then fully reformed. As the fight between Neko and Loki has gotten nowhere, Ryouta sacrifices himself to save her and the world from the total revolution. Three months later, Neko parts with the real world to dive into Edda so she can be with Ryouta forever.

A C-rank magic-user who had an accident while being harnessed. Her magic is the ability to see the near future when someone is about to die. Her entire body is paralyzed aside from her left hand. Kana uses a keyboard that synthesizes her voice to communicate with the outside world. Her research no. is 4010. Ryouta makes use of this to prepare in advance against those who pose a threat to Neko and the others. Kazumi states that Kana could move if she wanted to, but she refrains from doing so. It is later revealed that she silently vowed to protect Neko by retaining her power in foreseeing her death in the future that would be the reason for it. Kana poses as a mascot for the club. She is initially rude to Ryouta and the others, but she eventually warms up to them. She has to have her food in a liquid form to eat. After pushing the top button on her harness, Kana loses her foresight ability in exchange for the ability to move at super-speed, though has low stamina. Kana is actually now able to foresee in more detail whenever there's going to be a serious crisis. She grows close to Mina at the point she prefers her life over Ryouta's.

A B+rank magic-user specialized in computer hacking, gathering intel, and breaking encryption keys in mere seconds. Kazumi is half-Austrian but speaks Japanese with a Kansai dialect. Her research no. is 2670. Like Neko, Kazumi hacks in to get into high school then joins the same class and club as Ryouta and Neko. Kazumi tends to do perverted things. She gets angry when someone compares her chest size or makes fun of it. Following the act of falsely confessing to Ryouta to avoid her impending death informed by Mizuka, Kazumi proved her feelings for Ryouta afterward and desires to bear a child with him as living proof of her existence. It is proven that Kazumi's ranking is not indicative of her true abilities, which surpasses that of a ranked AAA. Engaging Loki's genocide assault, Kazumi pushes her limits to hack and destroy Loki's genetic memory inside the Edda and spare Ryouta; unfortunately, it leaves him only act on instincts, and Kazumi melts in the process. However, Kazumi's life has somehow succeeded. She is named after an Austrian ski jumper Gregor Schlierenzauer.

Another B-rank magic-user capable of "teleportation," though in reality she can only swap places with other people (even resets the kinetic energy). Her research no. is 1107. Kotori is cheerful but also a klutz. She has good cooking skills and registers for the club. She was friends with another magic-user hacker named Chie who died because she gave up her death suppressants to allow Kotori to live long enough to celebrate her birthday. The institute is after Kotori as their main objective, apparently being a person that could potentially destroy the world.
She has two hidden abilities: one is dispelling magic with an entity called the Grane, and the second is "Ain Soph Aur" aka "The Light That Rules Over Life" which can only be used when the consciousness inside her harness is released, is a light that is capable of fusing the cells of all living things together at the same time once it fully covers the entire planet destroying all life. When this power is released, Kotori kills herself via ejecting to save the world. It is revealed that Kotori is one of many containers for premature aliens. A clone Kotori sides with the astronomy club, and also dies protecting Ryouta and experiencing a nostalgic feeling. It is unproven that a Kotori lives in Edda based on a silhouette.
In a side story, Kotori's classmate, Hirano, was really fond of her and share lunches with her until her sudden transfer away. He asked Ryouta for her contact info, but fears to tell of Kotori's death.

She is a fellow A-rank magic-user with a straightforward attitude who possesses the power of regeneration with the capability of restoring her body, or the body of others, from otherwise fatal injuries though only within 5 minutes. Her regeneration is so effortlessly potent that she's able to regenerate from just her harness, meaning that she can only die if she doesn't take the medicine within the standard period of time or if her eject button is pressed. When she tested Ryouta's loyalty, she immediately becomes infatuated with him. Hatsuna becomes an important key to the club members' survival. She later bonds with her classmate Takaya, but soon after, she hatches. After killing Takaya, who steps in to stop her, she is smashed by Makina, but luckily her Drasil survived the unavoidable death, saving Takaya's life as well.

Vingulf
The institute meaning "witch castle" is the Organization that unearthed aliens in Germany by gold miners and a Japanese geologist (Ryouta's great-grandfather) in 1910, but never made it a public discovery, instead began the top-secret research over it to sought God's destruction. In the conclusion during World War II, they moved to Japan and gained secluded authority. Sorcerian research no. A008; and Loki are kept in incubator chambers for the uprising fate of humankind.

The chief professor in charge of the magic-user experiment. His mission is to capture the escapee magic-users, seeing the B-rank magic-users as failed specimens, and create the perfect alien no matter what the sacrifices are. In college, he was successful in engineering the digestive enzyme 'protease' which could be the source of the genetic melting. The higher-ups have him retrieve Kotori. He eventually learns that a high school boy is supporting the magic-users, but has yet to identify its Ryouta until Mako confirms Kotori's location. Chisato's younger sister  whom he only shows empathy to before her death. He implanted Rena's brain into Grane within Kotori's harness, only hoping to revive the Rena he knew, which is against the organization's intention. He later died from blocking the bullets for Mako.

A staff member at the research lab. He has an unknown backstory, but he used to feel really carefree for the magic-users. Chisato acknowledges him for his brilliance. Kurofuku gets fired when failed his last chance to capture the fugitive B-rank magic-users with Mizuka's foresight, and then he is a victim of an assassination attempt, but survives, although his brain had been greatly injured. He was abducted from a hospital by Mina. After months of recovery, he manages to locate the magic-users hideout, revealed to have abnormal strength to outmatch them before engaging by Takaya. When learning Nanami's forgiveness and Chisato's death, Kurofuku gives up his reasons and Miki invites him to Hexenjagd.
 
A newly-appointed employee placed to work at the Vingulf research lab. Not suitable for the job, however, she finds sympathy with the aliens and magic-users. She teams with Kazumi and the astronomy club during their infiltration inside the institute.

A woman who is Chisato's replacement and acquainted with the higher-ups. She has a sadistic and nearly bipolar personality and is also a magic-user with a harness just like that of Valkyria. It is shown that she can negate anti-matters. She has a shadowy objective when literally sending out magic-users that are about to hatch and ensure chaos. Onodera intends to use Valkyria to shape the world.

He is Ryouta's supposedly deceased younger brother and the prototype of Sorcerian (the ultimate hybrid of a male human and an alien chimera). Due to being imperfect, Makina's body melts if he stays too long in the outside world. His presence is more frightening than Valkyria and has a flawed behavior. He appears to have a massive ability to destroy and teleport far distant places and tries to take Neko for himself which infuriates Ryouta. Makina kills the President of the United States while holding a worldwide press conference before they announce the existence of aliens. He had the ambition to become Adam of the new world. Abusing the sudden revival of Sorcerian and losing interest in Neko, he gets devoured. Makina was instrumental to Vingulf's objectives, but after his death, it was revealed that a replacement for him was prepared in advance, and that replacement is no other than Ryouta himself.

The leader of Vingulf and Makina and Ryouta's father. The reason for the deception of his supposed death has not been revealed. He has harvested the Sorcerian, the source of all Drasils and the entire reason behind the organization's existence. It was completely conscious and aware since the beginning of Vingulf, and could easily leave at any time it wanted but it waited for a Valkyria to be brought to it first. Takachiho's determination is to revive Loki the gods feared, in order to destroy and recreate mankind. His two sons are born as hybrid alien humans for that purpose. He teaches Ryouta the belief in religions. Takachiho relatively says he cared for Ryouta, before getting killed by Loki.

Witches

A unique AA+rank magic-user. She is soft-spoken and has a taste in sugar. Her research no. is 5210. Her ability is scanning and modifying people's memories. Ryouta's observant skill impresses her. After having become friends with Neko and the club, she, unfortunately, melts from her harness ejected but managed to implant her consciousness within Ryouta's memory and she'll only appear occasionally or whenever Ryouta in a desperate situation and share personal intel. Overtime, Nanami able to manifest tangible illusions before Ryouta, such as her appearance as Aphrodite; however, she also reveals that her consciousness is occupying a huge part of his mind that will put his life at risk once he reaches his maximum capacity, and must be deleted from his brain to prolong it, which she does after instructing Ryouta to write down all he needed to know in order to locate Vingulf and rescue Neko in a notebook for him to memorize later. Ryouta now only remembers Nanami by name, marking her true and complete death.
Aphrodite can be seen in the Edda realm.

An AA+rank magic-user titled as the bombardment unit. Her research no. is 5010. She's a mere weapon that assassinates her targets with a strong beam fired from her mouth. Kotori tries her own hands to a pole and then switches positions with Kikako in defeat, who is later taken back to the lab. Despite Kurofuku's assurances that having succeeded in her mission, she will be spared, she is warned that harsh punishment awaits her. She is subsequently violently interrogated regarding her encounter with Kotori.

An AA-rank hybrid magic-user with two types of magic; she is able to slice anything within a 3-meter radius and can manipulate time by one minute although it will cause her to hang up immediately. Her research no. is 6001. As she failed to kill Neko, her harness ejected and her body melted as a result.

An AAA-rank magic-user. She possesses the power of technopathy and computer hacking just like Kazumi and is said to be the most powerful in that regard. Chisato gave Freya a room full of video games in exchange for her cooperation. She is now under the care of Yuki. Freya briefly engages in a battle against Kazumi.
 
The AAA-rank strongest magic-user, codename: Skadi. She has the foresight ability to see in a dream but with 100% exact accuracy as of future traveling. In contrast to Kana, her body also suffered a massive penalty for this power and as a result, she is no longer able to move or hear very well. Mizuka bonds with Yuki. In a future dream, she gives Kazumi options as to which future she wishes to choose. Using the last of her power, she melts the moment she informs Kurofuku of Kotori's whereabouts. It is presumed that Mizuka predicted the entire series' events.
The three magic-users that Onodera sends out to execute Kurofuku taking the precaution of the Valkyria incident. Rie's magic is unknown. Misaki capable of turning herself invisible, but that only affects herself, not her clothes, so she has to be naked. Rurumi controls people via a voodoo doll. They encounter Kana, surprised to see her alive and moving freely, and stop Rurumi from killing her. When they infiltrate the hospital, Rurumi's harness unexpectedly hatches, and the monster devours the body of Rurumi. Kana attempts to save Rie but gets both of her legs crushed. Believing the monster to be Rurumi, Rie allows it to devour her out of guilt. Misaki saves Kana and Kitsuka from the Drasil just before Initializer destroys the monster; Misaki's harness is then ejected having failed in the mission.

Valkyria

One of the strongest hybrid magic-users ever known with an S-rank. She is known to be a next-generation magic-user with a very complex harness. Mako's power capability is very large, with 8 different abilities. She can kill anyone in her sight within just seconds by dismembering them, detecting other witches' presence, and also has the ability to teleport and regenerate quickly. Her strongest power is to create anti-matter which is capable of destroying a whole wide-range area. She has a sociopathic personality with deep feelings towards Chisato due to saving her from genetic failure. Mako is claimed to be Neko's older sister and she is very protective towards her. After a gruesome fight with Neko, she was swallowed into Neko's micro black hole and all that was left is her harness. Ryouta then tramples on Mako's Drasil, eliminating her for good (finding herself with Chisato in the afterlife).

An SS-rank magic-user that was created by Vingulf following Mako's death, and it is said that she is the strongest Valkyria in existence. When she's still being held custody by Vingulf in a crucifix way, she manages to awake her teleport ability to run away, just to be recaptured by Onodera and brought back to the lab. Unlike Mako, she has a caring behavior, refusing to kill others even under coercion, but is ultimately forced to kill by Onodera when she starts ejecting witches in front of them, giving her the option of killing them instantly or watch them have an excruciating death, with the intention of awakening her true powers and turn her into an obedient killer. After terrorizing a rally at the National Diet, Eri is taken by Takachiho to have Loki consume her to increase his proportions.

Hexenjagd
A resistance group meaning "witch hunt" that is built by scientists who defected from the Organization due to the threat that they posed to God himself. Hexenjagd is responsible for the magic-users' escapee.

Miki is the founder of Hexenjagd. She initially speaks to Ryouta via the device Neko gave him. She first appears with the objective of capturing Kotori in order to confront Chisato and destroy the Grane inside Kotori. Miki wears a nun's hood with a short dress and stockings. She announces that all of the magic-users must die. When Ryouta protests, Miki explains the truth about witches - that their soul now resides inside the alien called "Drasil" within their harness and that the drugs merely feed the life form, allowing the Drasil to grow until it eventually hatches and devours their human body. She tells them that they sympathize with their plight.
In the manga, Miki offers the ingredients and protocol to create death-suppressant medicine in exchange for their assistance (just as Mizuka had foretold). Kazumi agrees to help find Kotori, but Miki promises that she will give them the formula for the drug after they destroy the Grane and that she will try to spare Kotori's life if possible. After Kotori's death, she fulfills her part of the bargain and gives Ryouta access to the formula, allowing Kogorou to provide the medicine to Neko and the others.

He has the appearance of a little boy. His real name is unknown. Initializer has the ability to nullify all kinds of magic from a witch, but he has to know what magic a witch used before he could "initialize" them. However, he can only nullify a witch's magic for eight seconds, except during the three-day New moon. He also can destroy a hatched Drasil instantly. It is unknown how he could have such an ability.

A former Vingulf researcher who got wounded during Neko's escaping attempt. She gave Neko a package and entrusted her the following mission: "Save the world from utter destruction and ruin." The package contains an alien's fertilized egg and a communication device. Neko later gave the alien sample and device to Ryouta.

Supporting characters

Ryouta's maternal uncle. Working as a scientist whom Ryouta entrusts to reproduce the medicine needed for the magic-users. He dislikes traveling long distances, rejecting invitations that include going overseas, and prefers to stay in his own town. He is doubtful of any supernatural phenomena unless Kana's foresight was proven or witnessing Nanami's death. Kogorou went to the same college with Chisato whom he admired. Then Kogorou gets captivated in examining the alien's fertilized egg that Ryouta had him look upon, and search for means to defend against Vingulf. The alien soon develops into an embryo. Sending a sample to America for some bait to learn the expectation of Vingulf's superiority, and then Kogorou deduces they are owned by a mysterious Dresden national government institute when examined the satellites' monitoring ranch through JAXA. He uses extreme methods in dealing with those who arrogantly want to take credit for the alien discovery.

A middle-school student who lives next door to Ryouta that he tutors. Kitsuka has a crush on Ryouta that he is completely oblivious to. She later becomes classmates with Kana when she starts attending middle school and befriends her after learning of her secret. Kitsuka is afraid of swimming but gains courage thanks to Kana. Sometime later, Kitsuka is found to have been taken to Vingulf in means to be Ryouta's Eve of the new world.

Ryouta's classmate. She regularly expresses how intelligent Ryouta is, even though he usually was distant from females. Risa befriends Neko the day of her transfer originally due to saving her from drowning and invites her to karaoke. Risa later gets into a car accident, and Hatsuna heals her burned wounds. As the story proceeds, she realizes Neko's mysterious power.

Ryouta's classmate. Takaya was first introduced when visiting the Maid café that Neko, Kazumi, and Hatsuna were serving at. He dropped out of the first semester because there were rumors it was a violent incident. He is handsome, with aggressive behavior, but actually kind-hearted. After fighting some bullies, he learns of Hatsuna's secret. He becomes fond of Hatsuna, then confessed when heard of her foretold death. However, Hatsuna's excitement at the time accelerates her hatching and she ends up almost killing him, just to later save his life after she is restored. Despite having a kind heart, Takaya is proven to have no touch while dealing with others, because as soon as Hatsuna agrees to date him, he demands her to have sex with him instead, much to her chagrin. He supports the astronomy club afterward.

The long-lost older sister of Kana Tachibana, says was kidnapped ten years prior. She is a journalist that is personally investigating Vingulf and the 'number of children that went missing in hopes that she will be reunited with her sister.
Examining the vast damage Valkyria caused, she suspects the story the media gave, that the damage caused by bombs (despite no sign of nuclear radioactivity) is a cover-up. Meeting with her fellow male reporter, the man cautions about her intention to inspect and warns her of possible danger. They learn about Kurofuku whom they believe had connections with Vingulf is confined in a hospital. Realizing this is the lead she was looking for, Mina conspires to move Kurofuku out, which they succeeded. Depressed that Kurofuku vanishes, she silently resumes her search with little hope from a photo (Rurumi's hatching and Kana's appearance) taken at the hospital. Until Mina and Kana reunite when visiting the Maid café. As Mina shares memories of their late parents with Kana and how to have been kidnapped, similar to Neko's case, they take an expensive trip to Ishigaki Island along with Ryouta's class to make up for the long separation. Unfortunately, Mina is killed by Makina, blocking the killing blow that was meant for Kana. She tearfully says goodbye to her sister.

Media

Manga

The Gokukoku no Brynhildr manga is written and illustrated by Lynn Okamoto. It was serialized in Shueisha's seinen manga magazine Weekly Young Jump from January 26, 2012, to March 31, 2016. Shueisha collected its 181 individual chapters in eighteen tankōbon volumes, released from May 18, 2012, to May 19, 2016.

Anime
 	
An anime adaptation was announced on November 11, 2013. The anime is directed by Kenichi Imazumi at studio Arms, with Yukinori Kitajima acting as head writer and Hiroaki Kurasu as chief animation director and character designer. The series premiered between April 6, 2014, and June 29, 2014, on Tokyo MX and later on ytv, CTV, BS11 and AT-X. For episodes 1-9 the opening is "BRYNHILDR IN THE DARKNESS -Ver. EJECTED-" by Nao Tokisawa. From episode 10 onwards, the opening is "Virtue and Vice" by Fear, and Loathing in Las Vegas. The ending song is "Ichiban Boshi" by Risa Taneda, Aya Suzaki, MAO, & Azusa Tadokoro.

Reception
Critical reception of the anime of the series has mostly been negative with many reviewers comparing it to the 2004 series Elfen Lied, also created by Lynn Okamoto, and the many similarities between the two works. In reviews of the anime the story has been called "shoddy" and "incomplete" with none of the characters being particularly memorable or having much depth. In addition they have also noted the overuse of harem antics and cliches to the extent that the series often feels more like an ecchi harem comedy as opposed to a serious sci-fi/horror series.

References

External links
Manga official website 
Anime official website 

Anime series based on manga
Arms Corporation
Dark fantasy anime and manga
Mystery anime and manga
Norse mythology in anime and manga
Science fiction anime and manga
Seinen manga
Sentai Filmworks
Shueisha franchises
Shueisha manga
Works banned in China